Open data in the United States refers to the Federal government of the United States' perspectives, policies, and practices regarding open data.

History
In the 1970s the National Oceanic and Atmospheric Administration began releasing weather information, which could now be called "open data".

After Korean Air Lines Flight 007, a Boeing 747 carrying 269 people, was shot down in 1983 after straying into the USSR's prohibited airspace, in the vicinity of Sakhalin and Moneron Islands, President Ronald Reagan issued a directive making the United States Global Positioning System of Air Force Space Command, freely available for civilian use, once it was sufficiently developed, as a common good. During the presidency of Bill Clinton the data actually was made available for public use.

Value of US government open data
Industry collects, processes, and resells open data from the United States government. United States government weather data is the base of industry industry which generates  billion annually. GPS data is the base of an industry estimated to generate  billion annually. Vivek Kundra noted that "Zillow is valued at over $1 billion, the Weather Channel was sold for approximately $3.5 billion in 2008, and Garmin has a market cap of $7.24 billion. These are all companies that were built using raw government data."

Open Data Policy

In May 2013 Barack Obama issued an executive order which established the Open Data Policy along with a memorandum from the Office of Management and Budget which supported that policy. These policies were developed as a way to promote economic growth and create jobs. They were guided by precedents and policies of the Sunlight Foundation and Open Knowledge. The Sunlight Foundation said at the establishment of the policy that it "certainly appears to be the strongest index and audit requirement" that the organization had seen.

The government published this policy on GitHub.

data.gov

data.gov is a U.S. government website launched in late May 2009 by the then Federal Chief Information Officer (CIO)  of the United States, Vivek Kundra.

According to its website, "The purpose of data.gov is to increase public access to high value, machine readable datasets generated by the Executive Branch of the Federal Government." The site seeks to become "a repository for all the information the government collects". The site would publish to the public any data that is not private or restricted for national security reasons.

See also

 Copyright status of works by the federal government of the United States
 Copyright status of works by subnational governments of the United States
 Public.Resource.Org
 Freedom of Information Act
 Open data in the United Kingdom

References

Sources

External links
Open Government Initiative at the White House
Project Open Data at the office of the Federal Chief Information Officer of the United States
data.gov data.gov, "the home of the U.S. Government’s open data"

Open data by location
Open government in the United States